This is a list of bat species by global population. While numbers are estimates, they have been made by the experts in their fields. For more information on how these estimates were ascertained, see Wikipedia's articles on population biology and population ecology.

This list is not comprehensive, as not all bats have had their numbers quantified.

See also
 
Lists of mammals by population
Lists of organisms by population
List of bats

References

bats
Bats